Don Condon (12 March 1923 – 15 February 1996) was an Australian rules footballer in the Victorian Football League, (VFL).

Condon began his senior career in the throw-pass era Victorian Football Association with Brighton, playing there in 1941 and kicking 55 goals. The VFA went into recess in 1942, and in 1944 Condon joined the VFL, trialling unsuccessfully with  before joining North Melbourne. He played with North Melbourne for just over seven years from 1944 until May 1951, and won the Syd Barker Medal as North Melbourne Football Club's best player in 1946. He returned to Brighton in May 1951 and played out the rest of the season there.

He was life member of the North Melbourne Football Club.

References

External links
 
 

North Melbourne Football Club players
Syd Barker Medal winners
Brighton Football Club players
Australian rules footballers from Victoria (Australia)
1923 births
1996 deaths